Eoghan Hickey (born 29 October 1981 in Dublin, Ireland) is a former professional rugby union player who played for seven professional clubs throughout four countries. During the 2005–06 Celtic League Hickey played for Leinster, before transferring to Munster for the 2006–07 Celtic League. Prior to this, he played for UCD in the All-Ireland League. In 2007 he transferred to London Irish on a two-year contract before joining Wasps in 2009. In 2010 he returned home to Dublin to play with Lansdowne in the All Ireland League, before joining up with the Italian club Petrarca Padova for the 2011→2012 season. From 2012→2015, Hickey played with Massy based in south west Paris during which time he completed his third university degree.

He has represented Ireland Schools, the Ireland Universities, Ireland U21 and Ireland A, and has also played in the Heineken Cup and the Celtic League.

During his playing career, Hickey also completed a BSc in Statistics from University College Dublin, an MSc in Climate Change Impacts & Sustainability from Brunel University London, and an MBA from HEC Paris. In addition, Hickey also holds a Graduate Diploma in Business Studies,  a Certificate in Advanced Management and a Certificate in Mergers & Acquisitions.

References
 www.the42.ie/eoghan-hickey
 www.itsrugby.fr
 espn.co.uk
 www.ucd.ie/sport
 www.premiershiprugby.com
 www.skysports.com

External links
 The Huffington Post
 The42.ie
 Twitter
 Munster Profile

1981 births
Living people
Rugby union fly-halves
Irish rugby union players
Wasps RFC players
Worcester Warriors players
London Irish players
Munster Rugby players
Leinster Rugby players
University College Dublin R.F.C. players
Alumni of University College Dublin
Rugby union players from Dublin (city)
Expatriate rugby union players in Italy
Expatriate rugby union players in France
Expatriate rugby union players in England
Irish expatriate rugby union players
Irish expatriate sportspeople in England
Irish expatriate sportspeople in France
Irish expatriate sportspeople in Italy